Izani bin Husin is a Malaysian politician and currently serves as Kelantan State Executive Councillor.

Election Results

Honours
  :
  Knight Commander of the Order of the Life of the Crown of Kelantan (DJMK) – Dato' (2022)

References

Malaysian Islamic Party politicians
Members of the Kelantan State Legislative Assembly
Kelantan state executive councillors
21st-century Malaysian politicians
Living people
People from Kelantan
Malaysian people of Malay descent
Malaysian Muslims
1963 births